Thomas Orr (born 13 January 1997) is a Scottish professional footballer, who plays as a striker for Stenhousemuir.

Orr has previously played for Greenock Morton, East Stirlingshire, Livingston, Queen's Park, BSC Glasgow and Stranraer.

Career

Morton
Having scored 24 goals by February for Morton's under-17 side, Orr signed a full-time two-year contract with Morton in May 2014.

He made his first-team debut for the first team in a Scottish League One match against Stranraer as a 79th-minute substitute for Michael Miller. Orr scored his first goal at Cappielow for the senior side in kitman Andy Bryan's testimonial against Celtic.

Orr agreed a new one-year deal to stay at Morton for the 2016–17 season.

He was released along with John Mitchell and Alex McWaters in May 2017.

Loan moves
In January 2016, Orr moved to Scottish League Two side East Stirlingshire on a development loan until the end of the 2015–16 season. Orr scored on his debut as the Shire won the Stirlingshire derby with Stirling Albion.

In July 2016, Orr went on a short-term loan deal to home town club Livingston. After six weeks, he was recalled from the loan deal. On 25 January 2017, Orr was sent on loan to Lowland League side BSC Glasgow until the end of the 2016–17 season.

Queen's Park
Orr moved to Queen's Park in July 2017, and scored his first senior goal against old club Morton in the Scottish League Cup.

BSC Glasgow 
Orr signed for BSC Glasgow on a permanent deal in June 2018.

Stranraer 
Orr returned to playing in the SPFL after agreeing a move to Stranraer in June 2020.

Personal life
Orr attended Gleniffer High School in Paisley.

Career statistics

Honours
Morton
SPFL Development League West: Winners 2015–16
BSC Glasgow
Lowland League Cup: Winners 2018–19  
Stranraer fc
SPFL League 2:   Team of the season 2020-21    
Stenhousemuir fc
Cinch League 2 player of the month January

See also
Greenock Morton F.C. season 2014–15 | 2015–16
East Stirlingshire F.C. season 2015–16

References

External links

1997 births
Living people
Sportspeople from Livingston, West Lothian
East Stirlingshire F.C. players
Greenock Morton F.C. players
St Mirren F.C. players
Livingston F.C. players
Broomhill F.C. (Scotland) players
Association football forwards
Scottish footballers
Scottish Professional Football League players
Queen's Park F.C. players
Lowland Football League players
Stranraer F.C. players
Stenhousemuir F.C. players